Reuben La Fave (September 27, 1915 – March 12, 1995) was a member of the Wisconsin State Assembly and the Wisconsin State Senate.

Biography
La Fave was born in Oconto, Wisconsin on September 27, 1915. During the World War II era, he served as a chief petty officer in the United States Coast Guard Auxiliary. He died due to complications from a stroke in Portage, Wisconsin on March 12, 1995.

Career
La Fave was a member of the Assembly from 1951 to 1955 and a member of the Senate from 1957 to 1976. He was also a member of the Oconto County, Wisconsin Board. La Fave was a Republican.

References

External links
The Political Graveyard

1915 births
1995 deaths
People from Oconto, Wisconsin
County supervisors in Wisconsin
Republican Party Wisconsin state senators
Republican Party members of the Wisconsin State Assembly
Military personnel from Wisconsin
United States Coast Guard non-commissioned officers
20th-century American politicians
United States Coast Guard auxiliarists